Navashanaq (also Romanized as Navāshānaq) is a village in Sanjabad-e Sharqi Rural District, in the Central District of Khalkhal County, Ardabil Province, Iran. At the 2006 census, its population was 64, in 11 families.

References 

Tageo

Towns and villages in Khalkhal County